The Buick Wildcat is a full-size car that was produced by Buick from the 1963 to 1970 model years.  Taking its name from a series of 1950s Buick concept cars, the Wildcat replaced the Invicta within the "junior" B-body Buick sedan range.  Serving as the higher-performance full-size Buick, the Wildcat was slotted between the LeSabre and the larger C-body Electra.  

Following two generations of the model line, the Wildcat was replaced by the Buick Centurion for 1971. With the introduction of the personal luxury Buick Riviera sales of the Wildcat dropped, as Buick full-size lines shifted away from high performance and entirely towards medium-price luxury.

Background
In 1962 the Wildcat was a Buick Invicta subseries, mating the Invicta's longer full-size two-door hardtop Buick body (known as the "sport coupe", body production code 4647 hardtop only) with a high-performance  version of the  Nailhead V8, known as the "Wildcat 445" for producing  of torque. To further distance itself from the Invicta, the Wildcat had Electra 225-like taillights, a bucket seat interior, and a center console with tachometer and transmission shifter. It had a Dynaflow transmission shared by all full-sized Buicks, plus special exterior side trim, vinyl-covered roof (new for 1962), and its own unique emblem: a stylized head of a wild cat, located on each of the C-pillars. However, the Wildcat did share the LeSabre's and Invicta's trio of VentiPorts on the front fenders, a design cue lasting only through the 1963 model year. The listed retail price was $3,927 ($ in  dollars )

First generation (1963–1964)

From 1963 to 1970 the Wildcat was its own series, no longer an Invicta subseries. The 1963 model had a large aluminum trim panel on the side, while 1964 models had vertically situated chrome hash-marks on the lower front quarter panel directly behind the front wheel housings and did not have the traditional horizontal VentiPorts like other Buicks. After becoming its own full series in 1963, the Wildcat added a convertible and four-door hardtop sedan to the original two-door hardtop coupe introduced in 1962. In the four-door version, a bench seat was standard but the bucket seat and console interior used in the coupe and convertible were optional. In 1964, a pillared four-door sedan was added to the line and two levels of trim were available - standard and custom, with a mid-line deluxe subseries added for 1965 only. From 1966 to 1969, the base (with trim similar to the 1965 Wildcat deluxe) and custom trims were again the sole options. The listed retail price for the Sport Coupe 2-door hardtop was $3,849 ($ in  dollars ).

The  401 cubic-inch Wildcat V8 remained the standard engine through 1966. This version also featured finned cast aluminum valve covers with the Buick logo embossed on the top. Also beginning in 1964, a three-speed manual transmission with column shift became standard equipment on all Wildcats, with either the four-speed manual (1963-1965 only) or three-speed automatic Super Turbine 400 transmissions as options. Engine names referred to engine torque output rather than displacement. The "dual quad" version of the Wildcat 465 was dubbed "Super Wildcat".

Second generation (1965–1970)

In 1966 a one-year-only Wildcat "Gran Sport Performance Group" package could be ordered by selecting the "A8/Y48" option. Two engine choices were available. The single carb 425 CID/340 hp V8 was included in the base package price with a  dual-carb set-up available at extra cost. Initially, this  upgrade remained a dealer-installed carb-intake modification bolted to stock MT-coded engines but eventually these "Super Wildcats" could also be obtained direct from the factory with MZ-coded engines. Rounding out both the base and Super GS packages were dual exhaust, heavy-duty suspension, posi-traction and updated rear quarter-panel "GS" badging in the new, initials-only format employed on all post-1965 Gran Sports. A total of 1,244 Wildcat GSs were built by Buick during the model year. Of those, 242 were convertibles and the rest were hardtops. A mere 22 (consisting of an unknown mix of both body styles) were Super Wildcats.

A styling appearance cue was adopted from the popular 1963 Buick Riviera, where the beltline arched up over the rear wheels, a modification of an older styling element called the "Sweepspear," with later vehicles installing a rub strip along the entire side of the vehicle tapering down as it reached the rear bumper.

The year 1967 brought a new engine to the Wildcat line (along with the Riviera and Electra 225) – a 430-cubic-inch V8 with four-barrel carburetor and  rating that featured larger valves for better breathing than the previous 401/425 Nailhead design that dated back to Buick's first V8, in 1953. The 430 was relatively short-lived as it was only offered through the 1969 model year. For 1970, the 430 was superseded by the largest Buick V8 engine ever – a 455-cubic-inch engine that was basically a bored version of the previous engine with the same large-valve design, a horsepower rating of 370, and torque rating of more than 500 pounds.

1967 and 1968 saw the addition of new federally mandated safety equipment that provided better occupant protection in collisions, and accident avoidance features as well. Like other full-size U.S. cars of the late 1960s, the Buicks became bigger, plusher, and less economical.

The Wildcat was offered only in Custom trim for its final year of 1970. It was replaced by the Buick Centurion for 1971.

Wildcat concept cars

Buick has used the name "Wildcat" for multiple concept vehicles.  During the 1950s, three Wildcats were designed under the guidance of Harley Earl, including the 1953 Wildcat I, 1954 Wildcat II, and 1955 Wildcat III.  The Wildcat I and II still exist today.

Buick used the name again in 1985 for a mid-engine sports car with all-wheel drive and a fully-exposed high-performance, double overhead cam V6.  The chassis used carbon-fiber and vinyl-ester resin and the body featured a 'lift-up' canopy for entry and exit.  The 1985 Wildcat is still owned by Buick today and is still operational.  

In 1997, a Buick Riviera Wildcat was created as a concept car.  Derived from the standard Buick Riviera, the Riviera Wildcat featured carbon-fiber interior trim (replacing woodgrain trim) and black chrome; the powertrain was upgraded for increased power.

On June 1, 2022 the Buick Wildcat EV concept car was revealed in a press release. The concept was an electric vehicle (EV) and was intended as a design study for Buick rather than a proof of concept for a future production vehicle. The intent of this was to create a new design language for Buick to be used as early as 2023, and to reposition the marque in the market to appeal to a younger audience than it had been reaching. This car complimented General Motors' commitment to produce only electric vehicles by 2030. Buick announced in this release that their first production EV is anticipated in 2024. The Wildcat EV concept incorporates a redesigned corporate Trishield emblem, which eliminates the ring and separates the shields from each other. The insides of the shields feature colored "swooshes", retaining the red, white, and blue color scheme of the old logo. It also appears that the new emblem can light up as well, similar to Lincoln's illuminated star emblem.

Notes

Further reading

External links

1962 Wildcat at secondchancegarage.com
https://www.buick.com/discover/news/electric-vehicle-future

Wildcat
Cars introduced in 1962
Rear-wheel-drive vehicles
1960s cars
Full-size vehicles
Muscle cars
Sedans
Convertibles
Coupés
Police vehicles
Motor vehicles manufactured in the United States